Drumgoon are a Gaelic football club from County Cavan in Ireland.  They are affiliated to Cavan GAA.

History
Originated as Bough Shamrocks in 1904, Drumgoon evolved as the parish team, then as the rural parish team, taking the name of Drumgoon in the 1920s. They contested their first Cavan Senior Football Championship Final in 1927, and were defeated by Cavan Slashers.

They adopted the title of Drumgoon Éire Óg in 1984. In 2000 Drumgoon lost the Cavan Junior Football Championship to Cornafean but a year later in 2001 Drumgoon won their first Championship winning the Cavan Junior Football Championship, beating Kildallon 1–10 to 0–07. They went on to win the Ulster Junior Club Football Championship beating Doohmalet of Monaghan and then the All-Ireland Junior Club Football Championship beating Belmullet of Mayo 1–14 to 0–12.

In 2002 they beat Denn 0–08 to 0–06 to win the Cavan Intermediate Football Championship. They also went on to Ulster Intermediate Club Football Championship final, losing to Sean MacDiarmada of Monaghan on a scoreline of 0–14 to 0–07.

Kit
Traditionally Drumgoon have always worn a blue jersey, shorts and socks with a yellow trim.

Honours
 Cavan Intermediate Football Championship: 2
 2002, 2011
 All Ireland Junior Club Football Championship: 1
 2002
 Ulster Junior Club Football Championship: 1
 2002
 Cavan Junior Football Championship: 1
 2001

 Ladies Junior Championship
 2015

See also
Cavan Senior Football Championship

References

External links
Drumgoon Official Website
Official Cavan GAA Website
Cavan Club GAA

Gaelic games clubs in County Cavan
Gaelic football clubs in County Cavan